The Federal Agricultural Mortgage Corporation, also known as Farmer Mac, is a stockholder-owned, publicly traded company that was chartered by the United States federal government in 1988 to serve as a secondary market in agricultural loans such as mortgages for agricultural real estate and rural housing. The company purchases loans from agricultural lenders, and sells instruments backed by those loans. The company also works with the United States Department of Agriculture. It is based in Washington, D.C.

History
It was created by the Agricultural Credit Act of 1987 as a federally chartered, private corporation responsible for guaranteeing the timely repayment of principal and interest to investors in a new agricultural secondary market. The secondary market allows a lending institution to sell a qualified farm real estate loan to an agricultural mortgage marketing facility, or pooler, which packages these loans, and sells to investors securities that are backed by, or represent interests in, the pooled loans. Farmer Mac guarantees the timely repayment of principal and interest on these securities and, under authorities granted in 1995, can also serve as a loan pooler.

The company was founded in the midst of a $4 billion bailout of the Farm Credit System, hoping to provide an alternative source of credit to farmers following the models of Fannie Mae and Ginnie Mae.

Financial crisis of 2008
In June 2008, Farmer Mac had $47.2 million invested in Fannie Mae shares. Over the next few months, in the wake of the Federal takeover of Fannie Mae and Freddie Mac, these investments lost about $44 million in value. The company also had significant investments in the newly-bankrupt Lehman Brothers Holdings. In response, the Farm Credit System bailed the company out by purchasing $60 million in Farmer Mac stock, and Zions Bancorporation of Salt Lake City purchased another $5 million in stock.

See also 

 Fannie Mae
 Farm Credit System
 Freddie Mac
 Ginnie Mae
 Sallie Mae

References

External links 

 Farmer Mac home page

Companies listed on the New York Stock Exchange
Companies based in Washington, D.C.
Agricultural organizations based in the United States
United States government-sponsored enterprises
Mortgage industry of the United States
Mortgage industry companies of the United States